Geovane Batista de Faria, known simply Geovane (born 20 February 1989 in Pedregulho, São Paulo), is a footballer who plays as a midfielder. He currently plays for CSA.

Career statistics

Honours
CSA
Campeonato Alagoano: 2021

Contract
 Goiás.
 Cruzeiro Esporte Clube.

References

External links
 
 

1989 births
Living people
Brazilian footballers
Goiás Esporte Clube players
Cruzeiro Esporte Clube players
Vila Nova Futebol Clube players
Agremiação Sportiva Arapiraquense players
Associação Atlética Aparecidense players
Cuiabá Esporte Clube players
Centro Sportivo Alagoano players
Campeonato Brasileiro Série A players
Campeonato Brasileiro Série B players
Campeonato Brasileiro Série C players
Campeonato Brasileiro Série D players
Association football midfielders